Star Spangled Rhythm is a 1942 American all-star cast musical film made by Paramount Pictures during World War II as a morale booster.  Many of the Hollywood studios produced such films during the war, generally musicals, frequently with flimsy storylines, and with the specific intent of entertaining the troops overseas and civilians back home and to encourage fundraising – as well as to show the studios' patriotism. This film was also the first released by Paramount to be shown for 8 weeks.

Star Spangled Rhythm was directed by George Marshall and others, and written by Harry Tugend with sketches by Melvin Frank, George S. Kaufman and others. The film has music by Robert Emmett Dolan and songs by Harold Arlen and Johnny Mercer, and the cast consisted of most of the stars on the Paramount roster.

Plot
Pop Webster is a former silent movie star once known as "Bronco Billy" who now works as the guard on the main gate at Paramount Pictures. However, he's told his son Johnny, who's in the Navy, that he's the studio's Executive Vice President in Charge of Production.  When Johnny shows up in Hollywood on shore leave, Pop and the studio's switchboard operator, Johnny's sweetheart Polly Judson, go all-out to maintain the illusion for Johnny and his sailor friends that Pop's a studio big-wig.  Things get a bit complicated when Pop offers to put on a variety show for the Navy, featuring all of Paramount's stars, but Polly convinces Bob Hope and Bing Crosby to do the show, and they convince the rest of the stars on the lot.

Cast

Performers:

Cast notes:
The character "B.G. Desoto" is modeled after Paramount executive producer Buddy DeSylva, and "Y. Frank Freemont" after vice-president Y. Frank Freeman. When pretending to be "Mr Freemont"'s secretary, Betty Hutton speaks in an affected Southern accent; the real Y. Frank Freeman was a Southerner who was intensely loyal to Dixie.
Others who appear in the film include Rod Cameron, Eva Gabor, Cecil Kellaway, Matt McHugh, Frank Faylen, Robert Preston and Woody Strode. Strode is seen only very briefly as Eddie Anderson's chauffeur in the "Sharp As a Tack" number.
Star Spangled Rhythm marked the feature film debut of Bing Crosby's son, Gary Crosby, who was 9 years old at the time.
 Although "Benito Mussolini", "Hirohito" and "Adolf Hitler" are listed as characters in this film, the actors cast in those roles are not actually portraying the dictators themselves; they are merely impersonators showing up for a brief sight gag at the end of the novelty number "A Sweater, a Sarong and a Peekaboo Bang".  Tom Dugan, a veteran character actor who appeared as "Adolf Hitler", also played "Bronski", an actor who plays the part of "Adolf Hitler", in Ernst Lubitsch's classic comedy To Be or Not To Be.

Songs
The songs in Star Spangled Rhythm were written by Harold Arlen (music) and Johnny Mercer (lyrics):

"Hit the Road to Dreamland" – sung by Mary Martin, Dick Powell and the Golden Gate Quartette
"I'm Doing It for Defense" – sung by Betty Hutton
"Old Glory" – sung by Bing Crosby and chorus
"He Loved Me Till the All-Clear Came"
"On the Swing Shift" – sung and danced by Marjorie Reynolds, Betty Jane Rhodes and Dona Drake
"Sharp as a Tack" – sung by Eddie "Rochester" Anderson, Katherine Dunham, Slim Gaillard and Slam Stewart, and Woody Strode
"A Sweater, Sarong and a Peek-A-Boo Bang" – sung by Paulette Goddard, Dorothy Lamour,  and Veronica Lake (dubbed by Martha Mears), and by Arthur Treacher, Walter Catlett and Sterling Holloway, in drag
"That Old Black Magic" – sung by Johnny Johnston and danced by Vera Zorina

Production
The working title of Star Spangled Rhythm was Thumbs Up.  Paramount paid Arthur Ross and Fred Saidy for the rights to two sketches from their musical revue Rally Round the Girls, which were used in the film.  The "That Old Black Magic" sequence, which was directed by A. Edward Sutherland, was intended to be directed by René Clair, who was unavailable at the time of shooting.

The film was in production from 11 June to 23 July 1942 at Paramount's studios on Melrose Avenue in Hollywood. Location shooting took place at the Naval Training Center in San Diego, California.  The final cost of the film was $1,127,989.  The film premiered in New York City on December 30, 1942.

In 1943, Broncho Billy Anderson (real name:Maxwell Henry Aronson) sued Paramount for using the "Broncho Billy" name without permission.  He objected to the "Bronco Billy" character in Star Spangled Rhythm being a "washed-up and broken-down actor", which he felt reflected badly on himself.  Aronson asked for $900,000, but the outcome of the lawsuit is unknown.

Veronica Lake and Alan Ladd both appear - and they would team in two other all star films.

Awards and honors
Star Spangled Rhythm received two 1944 Academy Award nominations: Harold Arlen (music) and Johnny Mercer (lyrics) were nominated for "Best Original Song" for "That Old Black Magic", and Robert Emmett Dolan was nominated for "Best Score".

The film is recognized by American Film Institute in these lists:
 2006: AFI's Greatest Movie Musicals – Nominated

See also

 This Is the Army
 Thousands Cheer
 Stage Door Canteen
 Hollywood Canteen
 Cowboy Canteen
 Thank Your Lucky Stars
 Private Buckaroo
 The Yanks Are Coming
 Reveille with Beverly

References

External links

1942 musical films
1942 films
American black-and-white films
Films directed by George Marshall
Films scored by Robert Emmett Dolan
Paramount Pictures films
American musical films
1940s English-language films
1940s American films